Coldblooded is an album by the Memphis, Tennessee-based funk band The Bar-Kays. Released in 1974, it was their last album for Volt Records before moving on to Mercury Records in 1976. This album did not chart.

Track listing
"Coldblooded" (James Alexander, Lester Snell, Lloyd Smith, Willie Hall, Winston Stewart) - 5:49   	
"Harmony" (Joe Shamwell) - 3:36 	
"In The Scheme of Things" (Charles Allen, Lloyd Smith) - 4:21 	
"Waiting and Hating" (Allen Jones, Harvey Henderson) - 3:57 	
"Smiling, Styling and Profiling" (Joe Shamwell) - 3:19 	
"Frame of Mind" (Allen Jones, Larry Dodson) - 4:37 	
"I've Got to Use My Imagination" (Barry Goldberg, Gerry Goffin) - 4:20 	
"Fightin' Fire With Fire" (Allen Jones, Lester Snell, Willie Brown) - 4:24 	
"Would I If I Could" (Allen Jones, Harvey Henderson, Larry Dodson) - 3:37 	
"Be Yourself" (Allen Jones, Harvey Henderson) - 3:32

Personnel
James Alexander - bass, lead vocals
Larry Dotson - lead vocals
Charles Allen - trumpet, lead vocals
Winston Stewart - keyboards, organ, vibraphone
Lloyd Smith - guitar (lead and 12 strings)
Harvey Henderson - tenor saxophone, flute
Willie Hall - drums
Hot Buttered Soul (Diane Lewis, Pat Lewis, Rose Williams) - backing vocals

References

External links
 The Bar-Kays-Coldblooded at Discogs

1974 albums
Bar-Kays albums
Volt Records albums